Pipe Creek is a stream in the U.S. state of Indiana. It is a tributary of the White River, and is named for Captain Pipe, a Delaware chief.

It has a mean annual discharge of 114 cubic feet per second at Frankton, Indiana.

See also
List of rivers of Indiana

References

Rivers of Delaware County, Indiana
Rivers of Madison County, Indiana
Rivers of Hamilton County, Indiana
Rivers of Indiana